Critchlow may refer to:

Andrew Critchlow (born 1974), business journalist
Anthony Critchlow of Living in a Box, British band founded in 1985
Carl Critchlow, British fantasy and science fiction comic illustrator
Donald T. Critchlow (born 1948), historian and professor of American political history at Arizona State University
Frank Critchlow (1932–2010), British community activist and civil rights campaigner
Hannah Critchlow (born 1980), British scientist, writer and broadcaster
Hubert Nathaniel Critchlow (1884–1958), notable as the founder of the modern trade union movement in Guyana
Joe Critchlow (born 1944), former Canadian football player
Keith Critchlow (1933–2020), artist, lecturer, author, Sacred Geometer and professor of architecture
Roark Critchlow (born 1963), Canadian actor, best known for appearing on the US soap opera Days of Our Lives
Stephen Critchlow (1966–2021), British actor, known for his work in the theatre and appearances on radio series
Tess Critchlow (born 1995), Canadian snowboarder, competing in the discipline of snowboard cross
William Critchlow Harris (1854–1913), English-born Canadian architect noted for ecclesiastical and domestic projects in Maritime Canada
William J. Critchlow Jr. (1892–1968), general authority of The Church of Jesus Christ of Latter-day Saints (LDS Church) from 1958 until his death

See also
Crichlow
Critchley
Kerriochloa